The Arusha Cultural Heritage Centre is located in Arusha, Tanzania. It is a place where the past and present of the Tanzania's 120-plus tribes can be viewed in a single compound. The centre boasts of various carvings, gemstones, artifacts, clothing and books.

The Centre has hosted the following World statesmen:
 's King Harald, Queen Sonja and Princess Märtha Louise
 's Thabo Mbeki and Zanele Mbeki
 's Bill Clinton
 's George W. Bush

References 
The Day Clinton Went Shopping in Arusha

External links
 Cultural Heritage - official site

Cultural heritage
Buildings and structures in Arusha
Tourist attractions in Tanzania
Tourist attractions in the Arusha Region